Aroline Sanborn (August 13, 1825 - July 10, 1900) was a nineteenth-century American diarist who lived in Kingston, New Hampshire. She was the wife of Dr. Samuel Bartlett (1811-1865), the great-grandson of Josiah Bartlett, one of the original signers of the Declaration of Independence. Mrs. Bartlett was not a well-known or famous woman, but her diary from the mid-nineteenth century is an excellent primary source for students interested in learning more about what domestic life for American women was like in the mid-nineteenth century.

External links
Harvard University Library Open Collections Program. Women Working, 1870–1930, Aroline Sanborn. A full-text searchable online database with complete access to publications written by Aroline Sanborn.

American diarists
19th-century American people
1825 births
1900 deaths
19th-century diarists